The Rev Dan Taylor (1738–1816) was the founder of the New Connexion of General Baptists, a revivalist offshoot from the Arminian Baptist tradition, one of two main strands within the British Baptist movement.

From Methodist to General Baptist
Dan Taylor was born at Sourmilk Hall, Northowram, near Halifax, Yorkshire, on 21 December 1738 to Azor Taylor and his wife Mary (Willey). Like his father he was a coal-miner who joined the Wesleyan Methodists in 1761, during his early twenties. Whilst never straying from Wesley's Arminianism, Taylor quickly tired of what he saw as Wesley's authoritianism. He determined to become a Baptist and set off for Boston, where there was a General Baptist church; on the way he came across a Baptist church at Gamston and in February 1763 was baptised there instead. Taylor was ordained a General Baptist and had begun organising the Birchcliffe Baptists, an independent grouping of dissenters around Hebden Bridge. The following year the Birchcliffe group built their own chapel. Taylor, a young man used to manual labour, quarried the stone himself.

Building the Chapel proved an expensive burden, so Taylor travelled on foot to Leicestershire in search of support. Among the independent Baptist congregations throughout the east  Midlands, there was a great deal of disillusionment with the current state of the General Baptists. Traditionally non-creedal, many General Baptist congregations were becoming increasingly liberal in their doctrine, obliging the more orthodox and the more evangelical among them to reconsider their allegiance.

Founding the New Connexion of General Baptists
In June 1770 Dan Taylor was able to bring together many of those Arminian Baptists disenchanted with the ‘Old General Baptists’ in ‘The New Connexion of General Baptists’. Well organised from the outset, the Connexion thrived, particularly in the industrial areas of the English Midlands. By 1817, a year after Taylor's death, the Connection had 70 chapels.

Taylor ministered to the Birchcliffe Baptist Church for twenty years until 1783 when he moved to a chapel in Wandsworth, south west London.

In 1798, the Academy of the New Connexion of General Baptists was founded in Mile End, east end of London. In 1813 it moved to Wisbech, Cambridgeshire.

Daniel Taylor's younger brother, John Taylor, was also a Baptist pastor.

Bibliography

Further reading

Dan Taylor's 'Reasons for Dissenting from the Church of England', as well as 'The General Baptist New Connexion Catechism on God' (both written in 1805), can be found in ‘'Protestant Nonconformist Texts Volume 3: The Nineteenth Century'', edited by David Bebbington (University of Stirling, UK), Burlington, VT, Ashgate, 2006. or: 
 pp. 105, 124, 147–149, 175, 233, 533, 536.

References

External links 

1738 births
1816 deaths
People from Northowram
18th-century English Baptist ministers
Arminian writers
Arminian ministers